Anzia pseudocolpota is a species of corticolous (bark-dwelling), foliose lichen in the family Parmeliaceae. Found in southwestern China, it was formally described as a new species in 2015 by Xin-Yu Wang and Li-Song Wang. It is named for its similarity to Anzia colpota, from which it differs by the presence of a central axis, a discontinuous spongiostratum (a layer of net-like anastomosing hyphae), and the presence of the lichen product divaricatic acid.

References

Parmeliaceae
Lichens described in 2015
Lichen species
Lichens of China